Pasquale Ciaramponi (20 May 1734 – 27 October 1792) was an Italian painter active in the Marche region in a late-Baroque style.

Biography
He was born in Treia, in the province of Macerata. He trained initially under Pompeo Batoni. He then moved to Rome, where he entered the studio of Gaetano Lapis. He returned to Treia and the Marche, where he painted portraits and sacred subjects. Among his works were paintings for:
 Frescoes in the tribune of San Francesco, Treia
 Altarpiece for San Filippo Neri, Treia
 San Vincenzo, San Domenico, Cingoli
 Altarpieces, Chiesa del Sagramento, Ancona

References

1734 births
1792 deaths
People from the Province of Macerata
18th-century Italian painters
Italian male painters
Italian neoclassical painters
18th-century Italian male artists